Emiliano Cotelo (born August 25, 1958) is a Uruguayan journalist and radio personality, known for his interviews with local and international politicians. His morning radio show “En Perspectiva” has been on the air continuously since 1985. Emiliano Cotelo is married to journalist and producer Alexandra Morgan. They have two sons and one daughter.

Education and career 
Emiliano Cotelo studied Engineering at the Universidad de la Republica in Montevideo, Uruguay. He began his radio career in 1976 producing and hosting his music program “Perfiles” in the state-owned SODRE stations. He started as a radio journalist in the newscasts of CX 30 La Radio (1983–85). In June 1985 Emiliano Cotelo joined the journalists Enrique Alonso Fernández, Carlos Núñez and Claudio Paolillo, who had recently started the morning show “En Perspectiva”, in Del Palacio FM station. After 1988, Emiliano Cotelo has hosted the show by himself. In 1992 “En Perspectiva” moved to AM 810 El Espectador station in order to reach wider audiences. In the 2010s he moved to CX 32 Radiomundo.

He has contributed to other media: newspaper El Observador, weekly magazine revista Tres, Channel 10 TV station. He has taught Radio Broadcasting at the Universidad Católica del Uruguay.

References

External links 
 Con Emiliano Cotelo: El dueño de la voz. Ocupa un lugar de primacía y desde un estilo distanto. El éxito de "El Espectador" y simbiosis y contradicciones de un periodista. Miguel Carbajal. El Pais de los Domingos. 8 June 2003
 Nuestros Conductores. Radio El Espectador. Biographies of Espectador radio hosts.

1958 births
Living people
Place of birth missing (living people)
Uruguayan radio journalists
Uruguayan radio presenters
Academic staff of the Catholic University of Uruguay
University of the Republic (Uruguay) alumni